William Gardner Choate (August 30, 1830 – November 14, 1920) was a United States district judge of the United States District Court for the Southern District of New York.

Education and career
Choate was born in Salem, Massachusetts, the son of George and Margaret Manning (Hodges) Choate. His younger brother was diplomat and lawyer Joseph Hodges Choate. Choate received an Artium Baccalaureus degree from Harvard University in 1852 and a Bachelor of Laws from Harvard Law School in 1854. He was in private practice in Danvers, Massachusetts from 1855 to 1857, then in Salem until 1865, and then in New York City, New York from 1865 to 1878.

Federal judicial service

On March 14, 1878, Choate was nominated by President Rutherford B. Hayes to a seat on the United States District Court for the Southern District of New York vacated by Judge Samuel Blatchford. Choate was confirmed by the United States Senate on March 25, 1878, and received his commission the same day. Choate served on the court for only three years, resigning on June 1, 1881.

Later career and death

Following his resignation from the federal bench, Choate resumed private practice in New York City from 1881 to 1920. With his wife, Mary Atwater Choate, he founded the girls school, Rosemary Hall, in 1890, and the Choate School, a boys school, in 1896, both in Wallingford, Connecticut (now combined as Choate Rosemary Hall). He died on November 14, 1920 in Wallingford.

References

Sources
 

1830 births
1920 deaths
Harvard Law School alumni
Judges of the United States District Court for the Southern District of New York
United States federal judges appointed by Rutherford B. Hayes
19th-century American judges
People from Salem, Massachusetts